are a kind of ceremonial origami fold entirely distinct from "origami-tsuki". They serve as gifts that express "good wishes". Noshi consists of white paper folded with a strip of dried abalone or meat, considered a token of good fortune.

See also
 Shūgi-bukuro

References

External links 

 Japanese traditional envelopes: Noshi
 The History of Origami: Noshi

Japanese words and phrases
Paper art
Origami
Ise Grand Shrine